Shane Casey (born 1989) is an Irish sportsperson.  He plays hurling with his local club Dunhill and with the Waterford senior inter-county team.

Hurling career

Club
Casey has played with this local club, Dunhill since underage, including in the Waterford Intermediate Hurling Championship and the Waterford Intermediate Football Championship. At underage, Casey played with the amalgamation club Dunhill/Fenor.

Inter-county
At inter-county level, Casey has played with Waterford.  Casey made his championship debut on 26 July 2009 having been named in the team which beat Galway in the 2009 All-Ireland Senior Hurling Championship quarter-final.

Casey also played with the Waterford under-21 team.  Casey was named in the squad to face Clare in the Munster Under-21 Hurling Final on 29 July 2009.

References

1989 births
Living people
Waterford inter-county hurlers
Dunhill hurlers
Date of birth missing (living people)